The plain prinia (Prinia inornata), also known as the plain wren-warbler or white-browed wren-warbler, is a small cisticolid warbler found in southeast Asia. It is a resident breeder from Pakistan and India to south China and southeast Asia. It was formerly included in the tawny-flanked prinia (Prinia subflava), resident in Africa south of the Sahara. The two are now usually considered to be separate species.

Description
These 13–14-cm long warblers have short rounded wings, a longish tail, strong legs and a short black bill. In breeding plumage, adults are grey-brown above, with a short white supercilium and rufous fringes on the closed wings. The underparts are whitish-buff. The sexes are identical.

In winter, the upperparts are a warmer brown, and the underparts more buff. The tail is longer than in summer. There are a number of races differing in plumage shade. The endemic race in Sri Lanka retains summer plumage, including the shorter tail, all year round.

Biology
This skulking passerine bird is typically found in wet lowland grassland, open woodland, scrub and sometimes gardens. The plain prinia builds its nest in a shrub or tall grass and lays three to six eggs. (The tawny-flanked prinia nests in herbage and lays two to four eggs.)

Like most warblers, the plain prinia is insectivorous. The song is a repetitive .

Gallery

References

Further reading
 Warblers of Europe, Asia and North Africa by Baker, 
 Birds of India by Grimmett, Inskipp and Inskipp, 
 Birds of The Gambia by Barlow, Wacher and Disley,

External Links

plain prinia
Birds of China
Birds of South Asia
Birds of Southeast Asia
plain prinia